Mount Takawangha is a stratovolcano located in Tanaga Island, Alaska. It sits in close proximity with another volcano known as Mount Tanaga, which shares the same name as the island itself. Older and more eroded volcanoes can also be found east of Takawangha. Its elevation is 4,754 ft (1,449 m), making it the second-highest peak on the island.

Geology 
Takawangha is a stratovolcano that may have last erupted in 1550CE. There are tephra cones in its crater and on its flanks. Takawangha's summit is mostly covered in ice, with the exception of four younger craters that have erupted in the past few thousand years.

There is a possibility that recent eruptions attributed to Mount Tanaga may have instead came from Takawangha.

See also 

 Tanaga (volcano)
 Tanaga Island
 Volcanoes in Alaska

References 

Volcanoes of Alaska
Stratovolcanoes of the United States
Holocene stratovolcanoes